Last of the Summer Wine's twenty-seventh series aired on BBC One. All of the episodes were written by Roy Clarke and produced and directed by Alan J. W. Bell.

Outline
The quartet in this series consisted of:

First appearances

Nelly (2005–2010)

Last appearances

Billy Hardcastle (1999–2006)

List of Episodes

Christmas Special (2005)

Regular series

Christmas Special (2006)

DVD release
The box set for series 27 was released by Universal Playback in October 2015, mislabelled as a box set for series 27 & 28.

References

See also

Last of the Summer Wine series
2006 British television seasons